Omalur is a panchayat town and headquarters of Omalur taluk in the Salem District in the Indian state of Tamil Nadu. It is situated on the National Highway 7 between 11° 73333" latitude and 78° 06667" longitude. It has a population of about 13,600. Agriculture, leather and handloom textiles are the major businesses.

History
In 14th century, Omalur Kottai (Fort) was built.

The Madurai Nayaks ruled, Omalur regionthe Gatti Mudalis were the made in-charge of Omalur, Taramangalam and others.

The Gatti Mudalis's rule extended east–west from Thalaivasal to Dharapuram and north–south from Omalur to Karur. After the fall of the Vijayanagara Empire, the Gatti Mudalis became the Palaiyakkarar of Omalur under Tirumalai Nayak of Madurai in 1623.

In 1660, Chikka Deveraja conquered Sankagiri, Thoppur and Omalur. In 1667, the Gatti Mudalis lost Omalur to Mysore. In 1688–89, Chikka Deva Raya, the king of Mysore, felt strong enough once again to invade Baramahal and the whole district of Salem came under his control before his death in 1704.

In 1815 Omalur taluk was absorbed into Salem taluk, but was recreated in 1819. It was again absorbed by Salem taluk in 1860, and again recreated in 1910. In 1916 Omalur taluk was bifurcated into Omalur and Mettur, and in 1941 Mettur Taluk was absorbed into Omalur.

Geography
It has an average elevation of 298 metres (977 feet).

Climate
The climate is generally hot and dry. Summer stretches from February to July with its peak during the months of April and May. Temperatures stay above 30 °C and can reach 37 °C. During this time it gets occasional spells of rain. During the months of August and September the South-West monsoons start and bring about 100 mm of rain. In October and November it receives the North-East monsoon.

Demographics
 India census, Omalur had a population of 16,279. Males constitute 49.3% of the population and females 50.7%. Omalur has an average literacy rate of 84.82%, higher than the state average of 80.09%: male literacy is 90.3%, and female literacy is 79.53%. In Omalur, 9.8% of the population is under 6 years of age. 88.13% of population are Hindus, 9.66% are Muslims and 2.16% are Christians.

Politics
Omalur assembly constituency is part of Salem (Lok Sabha constituency).

Landmarks
Sri Ramalinga Sowdeswari Amman

Education

Schools

 Vellasami Chettiyar Higher Secondary School, Omalur
 Fatima Girls Higher Secondary School, Omalur
 Jaya Jothi Primary School, Omalur
 Kalaimagal matriculation higher secondary school, RC Chettipatti, Omalur 
 SSRM Higher secondary school, karrupur.
 Mount Shervaroys Matriculation School, Poosarippatti
 Government Higher Secondary School, Nadupatti
 South Indian Matriculation & Higher Secondary School, Panchukalipatti
 Swamy Vivekanatha Matriculation School, Kadayampatti
 G. R. Matriculation School, Muthunaickenpatti.
 Wistom Gates Matriculation School, Kottaimariammankoil
 St. Joseph Matriculation School, Pagalpatti
 John Britto Matriculation School, Kamalapuram
 Govt Higher secondary school, Pannapatty
 Govt Higher secondary school, muthu Naikken Patty
 Govt Higher secondary school, Vellalappatti
 Govt Higher secondary school, Mattukkaranur
 Panchayat Union Primary School, Kamalapuram

Colleges and Universities

 Government Engineering College (Autonomous) (Anna University, Chennai)
 Periyar University, Omalur
 Dhirajlal Gandhi College of Technology, Sikanampatty, Omalur (Affiliated to Anna University, Chennai)
 Narusu's Sarathy Institute of Technology, Poosaripatti at Omalur town 6 km. Omalur (TK)Affiliated to ANNA UNIVERSITY, CHENNAI.
 Padmavani Arts & Science College (near Periyar University) at Omalur town 3 km. Omalur (TK)
 Balakrishna Polytechnic College at Omalur town 4 km. Omalur (TK)
 DPC Polytechnic College at Omalur town 6 km. Omalur (TK)
Padmavani Arts & Science College for Women
Kevi Women's College of Education
Dhanam College of Education
Sri Balakrishna Polytechnic College
Sri Balamurugan Arts and Science College

References

See also

Cities and towns in Salem district